Edward John Barge (August 29, 1910 – September 29, 1991) was an American animator.

Barge was born to Alfred Edward and Margaret G. Barge in San Jose, California. In 1916, the family moved to Bakersfield, where his father was employed by the Santa Fe Railroad and Pacific Western Oil Co. before retiring in 1954. He was the second of six children; his brother Henry was a photographer for the Bakersfield Californian. Barge attended St. Francis Parochial School and high school in Bakersfield, where he was a baseball and basketball star. He was still living in Bakersfield in July 1936 and was becoming known for his landscape paintings. He married Alice Davis, the daughter of Mrs. B.A. Davis of Bakersfield, in Beverly Hills on April 6, 1939.

He began his career at the Harman-Ising studio which shut down by August 1937 when Fred Quimby poached a number of its staff members to form the Metro-Goldwyn-Mayer cartoon studio. Barge worked at MGM as an assistant animator and received his first screen credit as an animator on Innertube Antics, directed by George Gordon and released in 1944. Gordon's unit had been disbanded the year before, at which point Barge was placed in the William Hanna/Joseph Barbera unit, then solely devoted to producing the Tom and Jerry cartoons; 1945's Quiet, Please! marks Barge's earliest credited work on the series. Barge subsequently remained at MGM for the next decade, eventually departing following production of the 1956 Tom and Jerry short Barbecue Brawl. 

Hanna and Barbera opened their own studio that same year and hired Barge in 1965 for the movie The Man Called Flintstone. He remained with Hanna-Barbera until retiring in 1982.

References

External links

Animators from California
1910 births
1991 deaths
Hanna-Barbera people
Metro-Goldwyn-Mayer cartoon studio people